Qasemabad (also Romanized as Qāsemābād; also known as Gultepe and Gūy Tappeh) is a village in Deh Chal Rural District, in the Central District of Khondab County, Markazi Province, Iran. At the 2006 census, its population was 1,398, in 314 families.

References 

Populated places in Khondab County